Hengyang Normal University is a university located in Hengyang, Hunan, China.

As of 2022, the Best Chinese Universities Ranking placed the university 15th in Hunan.

History
Hengyang Normal University was formed in 1904, it was initially called "Hunan Provincial Normal School". As of fall 2013, the university has two campuses, a combined student body of 16,000 students, 800 faculty members. The university consists of 2 colleges and 17 departments, with 39 specialties for undergraduates.

Academics
 School of Nanyue
 School of Continuing Education
 Department of Humanities and social sciences 
 Department of Political science
 Department of Economic Management
 Department of Law
 Department of Chinese language and Literature
 Department of Journalism and Communication
 Department of Chemistry and Materials science 
 Department of Tourism management 
 Department of Computer Science
 Department of Music
 Department of Art
 Department of Physical Education
 Department of Foreign languages 
 Department of Mathematics and Computing sciences 
 Department of Physical and Electronic information sciences 
 Department of Life Science
 Department of Education Science

Rankings 
As of 2022, the Best Chinese Universities Ranking, also known as the "Shanghai Ranking", placed the university 15th in Hunan and 380th in nationwide. The university ranked # 2486 in the world out of nearly 30,000 universities worldwide by the University Rankings by Academic Performance 2021-2022.

Culture
 Motto:

People

Notable alumni

 Zhong Daiying
 Zhang Qiuren
 Jiang Xianyun
 Huang Jingyuan
 Huang Kecheng
 Jiang Hua
 Tao Zhu
 Zhang Jingwu
 Zhang Pinghua
 Zhang Jichun
 Zeng Xisheng
 Tang Tianji
 Zhou Li
 Qin Guangrong
 Fan Fenfang
 Wu Yunfu

References

External links

 
Teachers colleges in China
Universities and colleges in Hunan
Educational institutions established in 1904
Education in Hengyang
1904 establishments in China